Tulin meaning Earth Forest is a form of geological clay formation. It takes the form of pillars which from a distance give the impression of a forest.

There are multiple examples of tulins in Yuanmou County in the Yunnan Province of China, in an area of about 50 square kilometers. The features are one to two million years old. The area was opened for tourism as the Yuanmou Earth Forest (Tulin in Chinese) in 1985.

Tulin formations in Yuanmou

Other tulins in China
Longyangxia Tulin (龙羊峡土林) in Gonghe County, Hainan Tibetan Autonomous Prefecture, Qinghai. 
Zanda Tulin (札达土林) in Zanda County, Ngari Prefecture, Tibet. 
Nanjian Tulin (南涧土林) in  Nanjian Yi Autonomous County, Dali, Yunnan. 
Jingdong Tulin (景东土林) in  Jingdong Yi Autonomous County, Pu'er City, Yunnan. 
Yongde Tulin (永德土林) in Yongde County, Lincang, Yunnan.

See also
Stone Forest
Hoodoo 
Tsingy de Bemaraha Strict Nature Reserve

References

Rock formations of China
Geology of Yunnan
Tourist attractions in Yunnan
Geography of Chuxiong Yi Autonomous Prefecture